Volodymyr Oleksiyovych Prychynenko (born 2 April 1960) is a Ukrainian football coach and a former player. He works as an assistant coach with SC Tavriya Simferopol.

His twin brother Serhiy Prychynenko, his son Stanislav Prychynenko and his nephew Denis Prychynenko (Serhiy's son) are all professional footballers.

References

1960 births
People from Pryluky
Twin sportspeople
Living people
Soviet footballers
SC Tavriya Simferopol players
FC CSKA Kyiv players
FC Dnipro Cherkasy players
FC Desna Chernihiv players
FC Nyva Vinnytsia players
Ukrainian footballers
Ukrainian expatriate footballers
Expatriate footballers in Germany
Ukrainian expatriate sportspeople in Germany
FC Temp Shepetivka players
Ukrainian Premier League players
Ukrainian football managers
Association football defenders
Sportspeople from Chernihiv Oblast